The C. N. James Cabin is a frontier-style log cabin, originally used as both a store and home, constructed in 1868. It was later also used as a church. It stands in what is now Augusta, Kansas, United States. The builder and proprietor of the store were Chester N. James, a merchant who moved to the area to establish a trading post. James was a central figure in the organization of Augusta Township and eventually the incorporation of Augusta itself. Augusta is named after James' wife. The C. N. James Cabin was added to the National Register of Historic Places in 1994. It has been restored to its original appearance and is now the part of the Augusta Historical Museum, which is operated by the Augusta Historical Society.

See also 
 National Register of Historic Places listings in Butler County, Kansas

References

External links
 Augusta Historical Society: C.N. James Log Cabin & Trading Post
 Augusta Historical Museum & C. N. James Log Cabin - article and photos

American West museums
Historic house museums in Kansas
Houses completed in 1868
Houses on the National Register of Historic Places in Kansas
Log cabins in the United States
Museums in Butler County, Kansas
Houses in Butler County, Kansas
Augusta, Kansas
National Register of Historic Places in Butler County, Kansas
Log buildings and structures on the National Register of Historic Places in Kansas